German submarine U-968 was a Type VIIC U-boat built for Nazi Germany's Kriegsmarine for service during World War II.
She was laid down on 14 May 1942 by Blohm & Voss, Hamburg as yard number 168, launched on 4 February 1943 and commissioned on 18 March 1943 under Oberleutnant zur See Otto Westphalen.

Design
German Type VIIC submarines were preceded by the shorter Type VIIB submarines. U-968 had a displacement of  when at the surface and  while submerged. She had two shafts and two  propellers.

U-968 was fitted with five  torpedo tubes (four fitted at the bow and one at the stern), fourteen torpedoes, one  SK C/35 naval gun, 220 rounds, and one twin  C/30 anti-aircraft gun. The boat had a complement of between forty-four and sixty.

Service history
The boat's career began with training at 5th U-boat Flotilla on 18 March 1943, followed by active service on 1 March 1944 as part of the 13th Flotilla for the remainder of her service.

Wolfpacks
U-968 took part in seven wolfpacks, namely:
 Hammer (17 March – 1 April 1944)
 Dachs (1 – 5 September 1944)
 Zorn (26 September – 1 October 1944)
 Grimm (1 – 2 October 1944)
 Panther (16 October – 10 November 1944)
 Rasmus (7 – 13 February 1945)
 Hagen (13 – 21 March 1945)

Fate
U-968 surrendered on 9 May 1945 at Narvik, Norway. She was subsequently transferred to Loch Eriboll in Scotland on 19 May 1945, and later to Loch Ryan as part of Operation Deadlight.
She was eventually sunk by Allied forces on 29 November 1945 in the North Atlantic in position .

Summary of raiding history

References

Notes

Citations

Bibliography

External links

German Type VIIC submarines
1943 ships
U-boats commissioned in 1943
U-boats sunk in 1945
World War II shipwrecks in the Atlantic Ocean
World War II submarines of Germany
Ships built in Hamburg
Operation Deadlight
Maritime incidents in November 1945